Loud music is music played at a volume considered intolerable to others.

Loud Music may also refer to:
Loud Music, an album by David Grissom
 "Loud Music" (song), a song by Michelle Branch

See also
No More Loud Music, an album by dEUS
"Dim Lights, Thick Smoke (And Loud, Loud Music)", a song by Joe Maphis, Rose Lee Maphis and Max Fidler